Ingar Knudtsen is a Norwegian novelist and poet, who was born 23 December 1944, in Smøla, Norway. He published his first book in 1975. Since then, he has released roughly one book every year. Only a few of his works have been translated into English. Ingar Knudtsen lives in Kristiansund.

Bibliography 

 Ensomheten er en sang. 2008
 Nekromantiker. 2004
 Rød storm. 2003
 Gudinnas døtre. 2002
 Amasoner. 2001
 Mannen med steinhodet. 1999
 I flaggets fold. 1998
 Ansiktet mot sola. 1997
 Natt uten navn. 1996
 Genfærdet. 1995
 For at jeg kan ete deg. 1995
 Havheksen. 1993
 Skumringslandet. 1993
 Nord for Saigon. 1992
 Kalis sang. 1991
 Løvinnens sjel. 1990
 Røde måne. 1989
 Våpensøstrene. 1987
 Tryllekunst. 1987
 Pandoras planet. 1986
 Katteliv. 1985
 Operasjon ares. 1984
 Reisen til jorda. 1981
 Tova. 1979
 Tyrannosaurus rex. 1978
 Lasersesongen. 1977
 Jernringen. 1976
 Under ulvemånen. 1975
 Dimensjon S. 1975

References

External links 
 

Norwegian writers
Living people
Year of birth missing (living people)
People from Kristiansund